was a mid-station along the Nakasendō in Edo period Japan. It was in between the post stations of Mochizuki-shuku and Ashida-shuku. It is located in the present-day town of Saku, Nagano Prefecture, Japan.

Neighboring post towns
Nakasendō
Mochizuki-shuku - Motai-shuku - Ashida-shuku

References

Stations of the Nakasendo in Nagano Prefecture
Stations of the Nakasendō